Tixpéhual Municipality (in the Yucatec Maya language: “place of the dwarf's greeting”) is one of the 106 municipalities in the Mexican state of Yucatán containing  (68.98 km2) of land and located roughly 25 km east of the city of Mérida, Mexico.

History
In ancient times, the area was part of the chieftainship of Ceh Pech until the conquest. At colonization, Tixpéhual became part of the encomienda system, which was implemented in 1607.

In 1821, Yucatán was declared independent of the Spanish Crown. In 1825 the area was part of the Coastal region, with its headquarters in Izamal Municipality. In 1847, during the Caste War of Yucatán the native headman was taken to prison and tortured after being suspected of collaboration with the insurgency against the Spanish.

In 1929, Tixpéhual was part of the Tixkokob Municipality.

Governance
The municipal president is elected for a term of three years. The president appoints four Councilpersons to serve on the board for three year terms, as the Secretary and councilors of public works, nomenclature, ecology, and markets and roads.

Communities
The head of the municipality is Tixpéhual, Yucatán. Other populated communities Chochóh, Cucá, Kiilinché, Los Flamboyanes, Sahé and Techóh. The largest populated areas are shown below:

Local festivals
Every year from the 17 to 20 December a fair is held.

Tourist attractions
 Church of San Martín 
 Hacienda Chochóh
 Hacienda Sahé
 Hacienda Techoh

References

Municipalities of Yucatán